In the Shadow of the Sun is a 1981 fantasy short film directed by Derek Jarman. It consists of a series of Super 8 films shot between 1972 and 1975 and edited together. Throbbing Gristle were asked to provide the soundtrack, which was released separately in 1984.

Cast
Karl Bowen
Graham Dowie
Christopher Hobbs
Gerald Incandela
Andrew Logan
Luciana Martínez
Lucy Su
Kevin Whitney
Francis Wishart

External links

1981 films
Films directed by Derek Jarman
British fantasy films
1980s English-language films
1980s British films
Films scored by musical groups